Chen Yanyan (born 5 April 1985 in Changsha, Hunan) is a Chinese swimmer, who competed for Team China at the 2008 Summer Olympics.

She is the younger sister of synchronized swimmer Chen Xuan.

Major achievements
2002/2003 National Champions Tournament - 4th 50 m free/1st 4×100 m medley relay;
2003 National Championships - 2nd 200 m back;
2003 National Intercity Games - 3rd 200 m back

References

 http://2008teamchina.olympic.cn/index.php/personview/personsen/1281

1985 births
Living people
Chinese female freestyle swimmers
Swimmers from Hunan
Olympic swimmers of China
Sportspeople from Changsha
Swimmers at the 2008 Summer Olympics
Universiade medalists in swimming
Universiade silver medalists for China
Universiade bronze medalists for China
Medalists at the 2007 Summer Universiade
Chinese female backstroke swimmers
20th-century Chinese women
21st-century Chinese women